Forkhead box protein F2 is a protein that in humans is encoded by the FOXF2 gene.

Location 
The FOXF2 gene is on the short arm of chromosome 6 at position 24.

Function 
The FOXF2 gene belongs to the forkhead family, also known as FOX proteins, which is a family of transcription factors characterized by a distinct forkhead domain. FOXF2 helps regulate several pulmonary genes, and is expressed in the lungs and placenta.

References

Forkhead transcription factors